
MacQuarrie is a family name of Scottish origin. It is an Anglicisation of the Gaelic Mac Guaire, which was a patronymic form of the Gaelic personal name meaning "proud" or "noble".

Notable people with the family name MacQuarrie
Albert MacQuarrie, silent film actor
Bob MacQuarrie, Canadian politician
Frank MacQuarrie, American actor
Heath MacQuarrie, Canadian politician
John Macquarrie, British philosopher and theologian
Michael MacQuarrie, Canadian-American physician 
Melanie Morse MacQuarrie, Canadian actress
Murdock MacQuarrie, actor
Ralph Angus McQuarrie, American conceptual designer and illustrator
Robert H. MacQuarrie, Canadian politician

Other
Clan MacQuarrie, a Scottish clan.

Related names
Macquarie
McQuarrie
 Macquarrie

Footnotes